Accor Arena (originally known as the Palais Omnisports de Paris-Bercy, 1984–2014, later Bercy Arena, 2014–2015 and AccorHotels Arena, 2015–2020), also known as Bercy in competitions where commercial names are prohibited, such as in the Olympic Games, is an indoor sports arena and concert hall located in the neighbourhood of Bercy, on the Boulevard de Bercy, in the 12th arrondissement of Paris, France. The closest Métro station is Bercy, which also serves the Finance Ministry across the street.

Designed by the architectural firm Andrault-Parat, Jean Prouvé and Aydin Guvan, the arena has a pyramidal shape and walls covered with a sloping lawn. It has a seating capacity ranging from 7,000 to 20,300, depending on the event. As part of the 2014–2015 renovations efforts, the arena was renamed to Bercy Arena on 1 January 2015. It was again renamed to AccorHotels Arena in October 2015, until it received its current name in June 2020.

Events

Music
The arena is one of the main venues for concerts in Paris. It has hosted numerous French and international performers over the years. Among those who have performed there the most are French rock singer Johnny Hallyday with 93 solo concerts from 1987 to 2016 and 6 concerts with the group Les vieilles canailles, French singer-songwriter Michel Sardou with 91 concerts from 1989 to 2012, French entertainer Dorothée with 56 concerts from 1990 to 1996 and another in 2010, Canadian singer Celine Dion with 35 concerts from 1995 to 2017, Canadian-born French singer Mylène Farmer with 33 concerts from 1989 to 2013, as well as American singer-songwriter Madonna with 25 concerts from 1990 to 2023. French electronic music duo Daft Punk performed and recorded their performance for Alive 2007 at Bercy. Norwegian band A-ha played 2 concerts at Bercy in 1988.

Sports

The Accor Arena is the main venue for the Paris Masters ATP Tour tennis tournament, and hosts the annual LNB All-Star Game basketball event and the Grand Slam Paris judo tournament. It is also used for many other sports events, such as table tennis, handball, basketball, boxing, gymnastics, track cycling and show jumping.

Since 1985, the arena has been hosting the annual Festival des Arts Martiaux.

POPB hosted the European gymnastics championship in 2000, the 1991 and 1996 FIBA EuroLeague Final Fours, and the FIBA EuroBasket championship in 1999, among others. It also hosted the 2009–10 EuroLeague Final Four. It also hosted the Masters Karting Paris Bercy star race, from 1993 to 2001, and again in 2011. It was co-host of the 2017 IIHF World Championship and the FIBA Women's EuroBasket 2021.

The arena hosted the 2017 European League of Legends Championship Series Summer Finals and the 2019 League of Legends World Championship Finals.

On January 24, 2020, it hosted an NBA regular season game between the Milwaukee Bucks and Charlotte Hornets, who would be represented by Frenchman Nicolas Batum. The Chicago Bulls beat the Detroit Pistons 126-108 at the arena on January 19, 2023 during the 2022–23 NBA season.

The arena hosted France's first UFC event on 3 September 2022, for UFC Fight Night: Gane vs. Tuivasa.

The arena is set to be a venue for the 2024 Summer Olympics.

See also
List of tennis stadiums by capacity
List of indoor arenas in France
Nicolas Dupeux

References

External links

 

Accor
Indoor arenas in France
Sports venues in Paris
Indoor ice hockey venues in France
Basketball venues in France
Tennis venues in France
Handball venues in France
Boxing venues in France
Buildings and structures in the 12th arrondissement of Paris
Sports venues completed in 1984
Indoor track and field venues
1984 establishments in France
Music venues completed in 1984
Judo venues
Music venues in Paris
Venues of the 2024 Summer Olympics
Olympic judo venues
Olympic basketball venues
Olympic wrestling venues
Music venues in France
Esports venues in France